Aftab Jawaid (also transliterated Aftab Javed) is a former squash player from Pakistan, who was one of the game's leading players in the 1960s. He won the British Amateur championship three times (in 1963, 1964 and 1965) and finished runner-up at the British Open three times (in 1966, 1967 and 1971). He arranged the PIA squash tour and was the national coach.

He was born in Gurdaspur, 1937 and nowadays he resides in Manchester. He has a son and two daughters.

References

External links
 
 Pakistan Squash Part 4 – from the-south-asian.com
 SocialPk

Pakistani male squash players
Year of birth missing (living people)
Living people